Ovacık (literally "little plains" or "little lowlands" in Turkish) may refer to the following places in Turkey:

Districts
 Ovacık, Karabük, a town and district of Karabük Province
 Ovacık, Tunceli, a small city and district of Tunceli Province

Villages

 Ovacık, Ardanuç, a village in the district of Ardanuç, Artvin Province
 Ovacık, Aşkale
 Ovacık, Başmakçı, a village in the district of Başmakçı, Afyonkarahisar Province
 Ovacık, Biga
 Ovacık, Çanakkale
 Ovacık, Çankırı
 Ovacık, Çine, a village in the district of Çine, Aydın Province
 Ovacık, Çubuk, a village in the district of Çubuk, Ankara Province
 Ovacık, Elmalı, a village in the district of Elmalı, Antalya Province
 Ovacık, Fethiye, a village in the district of Fethiye, Muğla Province
 Ovacık, Honaz
 Ovacık, Kahta, a village in the district of Kahta, Adıyaman Province
 Ovacık, Kemer, a village in the district of Kemer, Antalya Province
 Ovacık, Kuyucak, a village in the district of Kuyucak, Aydın Province
 Ovacık, Lüleburgaz, a village in the district of Lüleburgaz, Kırklareli Province
 Ovacık, Nazilli, a village in the district of Nazilli, Aydın Province
 Ovacık, Samsat, a village in the district of Samsat, Adıyaman Province
 Ovacık, Silifke, a village in the district of Silifke, Mersin Province
 Ovacık, Tavas
 Ovacık, Vezirköprü, a village in the district of Vezirköprü, Samsun Province
 Ovacık, Yapraklı

See also
 Yeşilovacık, a town in the district of Silifke, Mersin Province, Turkey